Field Marshal William Riddell Birdwood, 1st Baron Birdwood,  (13 September 1865 – 17 May 1951) was a British Army officer. He saw active service in the Second Boer War on the staff of Lord Kitchener. He saw action again in the First World War as Commander of the Australian and New Zealand Army Corps during the Gallipoli Campaign in 1915, leading the landings on the peninsula and then the evacuation later in the year, before becoming commander-in-chief of the Fifth Army on the Western Front during the closing stages of the war. He went on to be general officer commanding the Northern Army in India in 1920 and Commander-in-Chief, India, in 1925.

Early life
William Riddell Birdwood was born on 13 September 1865 in Kirkee, India. His father, Herbert Mills Birdwood, born in Bombay and educated in the UK, had returned to India in 1859 after passing the Indian Civil Service examination. In 1861, Herbert Birdwood married Edith Marion Sidonie, the eldest daughter of Surgeon-Major Elijah George Halhed Impey of the Bombay Horse Artillery and postmaster-general of the Bombay Presidency. They had five sons and a daughter; William was their second son. At the time of William's birth, his father held positions in the Bombay legislative council, and went on to become a Bombay high court judge. William Birdwood was educated at Clifton College.

Military career
After securing a militia commission in the 4th Battalion Royal Scots Fusiliers in 1883, Birdwood trained at the Royal Military College, Sandhurst, from which he was commissioned early, owing to the Russian war scare of 1885, becoming a lieutenant in the 12th (Prince of Wales's) Royal Lancers on 9 May 1885. He joined his regiment in India and then transferred from the 12th Royal Lancers to the Bengal Staff Corps on 20 December 1886. He subsequently transferred to the 11th Bengal Lancers in 1887, seeing action on the North-West Frontier in 1891. He later became adjutant of the Viceroy's Bodyguard in 1893. He was promoted to captain on 9 May 1896 and saw action during the Tirah Campaign in 1897.

Birdwood served in the Second Boer War, initially as brigade-major with a mounted brigade in Natal from 10 January 1900 and then as Deputy-Assistant Adjutant-General on the staff of Lord Kitchener from 15 October 1900. Promoted to brevet major on 20 November 1901 and local lieutenant-colonel in October 1901, he became military secretary to Lord Kitchener on 5 June 1902, and followed him on his return to the United Kingdom on board the SS Orotava, which arrived in Southampton on 12 July 1902. He received a brevet promotion to lieutenant-colonel in the South African Honours list published on 26 June 1902. In a despatch from June 1902, Lord Kitchener wrote the following about his work in South Africa:
This young officer has held a difficult position as Assistant Adjutant-General, Mounted Troops, and responsible adviser as to the distribution of remounts. In carrying out these duties he has proved himself to possess exceptional ability, and he has shown, moreover, remarkable tact in dealing with and conciliating the various interests which he had to take into consideration.

When Kitchener went to India as commander-in-chief in November 1902, Birdwood joined him there as assistant military secretary and interpreter. He was promoted to the substantive rank of major on 9 May 1903 and appointed Military Secretary to Lord Kitchener with the rank of full colonel on 26 June 1905. Having been appointed an aide-de-camp to the King on 14 February 1906, he was given command of the Kohat Brigade on the North West Frontier in 1908 and promoted to temporary brigadier-general on 28 June 1909.

Promoted to the rank of major-general on 3 October 1911, Birdwood became quartermaster-general in India and a member of the Viceroy's Legislative Council in 1912 and then Secretary of the Indian Army Department in 1913.

Gallipoli

In November 1914 Birdwood was instructed by Kitchener to form an army corps from the Australian and New Zealand troops that were training in Egypt. He was promoted to temporary lieutenant-general on 12 December 1914 and given command of the Australian and New Zealand Army Corps. Kitchener instructed General Sir Ian Hamilton, Commander of the Mediterranean Expeditionary Force, to carry out an operation to capture the Gallipoli peninsula and placed Birdwood's ANZAC Corps under Hamilton's command. Hamilton ordered Birdwood to carry out a landing on 25 April 1915 north of Kabatepe at a site now known as ANZAC Cove. The ANZAC Corps encountered high ridges, narrow gullies, dense scrub and strong Turkish resistance and became pinned down. Major-General William Bridges and Major-General Alexander Godley, the divisional commanders, were both of the view that the Allied forces, dealing with stiffer-than-expected resistance, should be evacuated ahead of an expected attack by Turkish forces. Nevertheless, Hamilton ordered them to hold fast.

Birdwood took effective command of the Australian Imperial Force, i.e. all Australian Forces in May 1915 while still commanding Allied troops on the ground at Gallipoli. He launched a major attack on the Turks in August 1915 (the Battle of Sari Bair) but still failed to dislodge them from the peninsula. Notwithstanding this, he was the only corps commander opposed to abandoning Gallipoli. He was promoted to the permanent rank of lieutenant-general on 28 October 1915 and given command of the newly formed Dardanelles Army: the one outstanding success of the campaign was the evacuation led by Birdwood, which took place in December 1915 and January 1916, when the entire force was withdrawn before any Turkish reaction.

Western Front

In February 1916 the Australian and New Zealand contingents, back in Egypt, underwent reorganisation to incorporate the new units and reinforcements that had accumulated during 1915: the Australian and New Zealand Army Corps was replaced by two corps, I ANZAC Corps and II ANZAC Corps, and Birdwood reverted to the command of II ANZAC Corps. When I ANZAC Corps became the first to depart for France, Birdwood, as senior corps commander, took over command. During early 1916 Birdwood advocated for the formation of an Australian and New Zealand Army or a Dominion Army also including Canadian forces under his command, but this did not occur.

Birdwood was promoted to the permanent rank of full general on 23 October 1917 with command of a formation then known as the Australian Corps in November 1917. He was also appointed aide-de-camp general to the King on 2 November 1917 and given command of the British Fifth Army on 31 May 1918 and led the Army at the liberation of Lille in October 1918 and at the liberation of Tournai in November 1918.

After the war
Birdwood was made a Baronet, of Anzac and of Totnes, in the County of Devon, on 29 December 1919. He toured Australia to great acclaim in 1920 and then became general officer commanding the Northern Army in India later that year. He was promoted to field marshal (with the corresponding honorary rank in the Australian Military Forces) on 20 March 1925 and, having been appointed a Member of the Executive Council of the Governor-General of India in July 1925, he went on to be Commander-in-Chief, India, in August 1925.

After leaving the service in 1930, Birdwood made a bid to become Governor-General of Australia. He had the backing of the King and the British government. However, the Australian Prime Minister James Scullin insisted that his Australian nominee Sir Isaac Isaacs be appointed. Instead, Birdwood was appointed Master of Peterhouse, Cambridge on 20 April 1931 and Captain of Deal Castle in 1934. In 1935 he wrote for the Western Australian distance education magazine Our Rural Magazine claiming that he had two granddaughters making good use of distance courses for educational purposes. In May 1936, he returned to Gallipoli aboard RMS Lancastria and visited war memorials on the peninsula. He retired from academic work in 1938.

In retirement Birdwood was Colonel of the 12th Royal Lancers (1920–1951), the 6th Gurkha Rifles (1926–1951), and the 75th (Home Counties) (Cinque Ports) Heavy Anti-Aircraft Regiment, Royal Artillery (1939–1951). In January 1936 he attended the funeral of King George V and in May 1937 he was present for the coronation of King George VI. He was raised to the peerage in recognition of his wartime service as Baron Birdwood, of Anzac and of Totnes in the County of Devon, on 25 January 1938.

His autobiography Khaki and Gown (1941) was followed by In my time: recollections and anecdotes (1946). Lord Birdwood died at Hampton Court Palace, where he lived in grace-and-favour apartments, on 17 May 1951.  He was buried at Twickenham Cemetery with full military honours. The Australian Government still pays for the upkeep of his grave.

Honours and awards

British
Knight Grand Cross of the Order of the Bath (GCB) – 1 January 1923 (KCB: 4 June 1917; CB: 19 June 1911)
Knight Grand Commander of the Order of the Star of India (GCSI) – 1 January 1930 (KCSI: 1 January 1915; CSI: 1 January 1910)
Knight Grand Cross of the Order of St Michael and St George (GCMG) – 1 January 1919 (KCMG: 3 June 1915)
Knight Grand Cross of the Royal Victorian Order (GCVO) – 11 May 1937
Companion of the Order of the Indian Empire (CIE) – 1 January 1908
Companion of the Distinguished Service Order (DSO) – 14 August 1908
Knight of Grace of the Venerable Order of St. John (KStJ) – 21 June 1927

Foreign
 Croix de Guerre (France), 22 February 1916 and 11 March 1919 (with Palm)
 Grand Officer of the Order of the Crown (Belgium) – 2 November 1916
 Croix de Guerre (Belgium) – 11 March 1918
Distinguished Service Medal (United States) – 12 July 1919
 Grand Cross of the Order of the Tower and Sword (Portugal) – 21 August 1919
 Grand Cordon of the Order of the Rising Sun (Japan) – 21 January 1921

Family
In 1893 Birdwood married Janetta Bromhead, daughter of Sir Benjamin Bromhead; they had a son and two daughters. His wife died in 1947. Their son, Christopher Birdwood (1899–1962), succeeded him as 2nd Baron Birdwood. The elder daughter was Constance 'Nancy' Birdwood, and the younger daughter was Judith Birdwood. Other members of the Birdwood family include Labour minister and peer Christopher Birdwood Thomson (1875–1930), Anglo-Indian naturalist Sir George Birdwood (1832–1917), and Jane Birdwood (1913–2000), the second wife of William Birdwood's son.

Legacy 
The town of Blumberg, South Australia, changed its German name to Birdwood in 1918, and the soldier settlement of Birdwoodton, Victoria was named after Birdwood in 1920. Mount Birdwood in Alberta, Canada also bears his name. Many streets and public spaces in Australia and New Zealand are named or commonly believed to be named after Birdwood, including Birdwood Park in Newcastle West in 1920 and a street in New Lambton in 1919.

Coat of arms

References

Sources

External links

 A. J. Hill, 'Birdwood, William Riddell (Baron Birdwood) (1865–1951)', Australian Dictionary of Biography, Volume 7, Melbourne University Press, 1979, pp 293–296.
 Birdwood's introduction to The New Zealanders at Gallipoli
 Birdwood's AIF service record, available in the  Australian National Archives as a digital image
Birdwood presenting medals during the First World War (British-Pathé)
Bust of Birdwood by Barbara Tribe (Australian National Portrait Gallery)
In the thick of it, article on Birdwood and items relating to him at the Australian National Portrait Gallery
Collection of photographs and artworks of Birdwood (UK National Portrait Gallery)
Collection of photographs of Lady Birdwood, also includes photographs of their younger daughter Judith (UK National Portrait Gallery)

|-
 

|-

1865 births
1951 deaths
Australian generals
British Army cavalry generals of World War I
British Commanders-in-Chief of India
British field marshals
British Indian Army generals
British military personnel of the Second Boer War
Captains of Deal Castle
Fellows of Peterhouse, Cambridge
Field marshals of Australia
Masters of Peterhouse, Cambridge
People educated at Clifton College
People from Pune district
Royal Horse Guards officers
Royal Scots Fusiliers officers
Graduates of the Royal Military College, Sandhurst
12th Royal Lancers officers
1
Barons created by George VI

Companions of the Distinguished Service Order
Companions of the Order of the Indian Empire
Knights Grand Commander of the Order of the Star of India
Knights Grand Cross of the Order of St Michael and St George
Knights Grand Cross of the Order of the Bath
Knights Grand Cross of the Royal Victorian Order
Knights of Grace of the Order of St John
Chevaliers of the Légion d'honneur
Grand Officers of the Order of Aviz
Grand Officers of the Order of the Crown (Belgium)
Recipients of the Croix de guerre (Belgium)
Recipients of the Croix de Guerre 1914–1918 (France)
Recipients of the Order of the Tower and Sword
Military personnel of British India
People from Pune
Members of the Council of the Governor General of India